Ramjerd Rural District may refer to:
 Ramjerd 1 Rural District
 Ramjerd 2 Rural District